Cletus Dominic Jacob Paul (born 26 April 1993) is an Indian professional footballer who plays as a striker for NorthEast United in the I-League 2nd Division.

Career

Mumbai
Paul studied in St Annes High School Orlem Malad West where he regularly placed for the school in the interschool championship setup.
Paul made his professional debut for Mumbai on 27 April 2014 against Mohammedan at Balewadi Sports Complex in which he came on as a substitute for Dane Pereira in 56th minute and was again replaced by Manuel D'Souza in 85th minute as Mumbai lost the match 1–2.

Young Muslim
In 2017, Paul played for Young Muslim in the Nagpur Elite Division. He led the club to their third straight championship.

Bengaluru FC
Cletus joined Bengaluru FC reserve team in October 2017 after impressive show in Nagpur Elite Division for Young Muslims FC. He made his debut for the senior team when he was substituted in during the second half against Transport United F.C. in 2018 AFC Cup preliminary round.

Professional statistics

References

External links 
 
 

1993 births
Living people
Indian footballers
Mumbai FC players
Association football forwards
I-League players
Footballers from Mumbai